Jean II de Montmorency (c. 1404 – 6 July 1477, buried at Senlis), held the office of Grand Chamberlain of France. He was the eldest son of Jacques de Montmorency and Lady Philippine de Melun of Croisilles and Courrières, daughter of Hugues de Melun d'Epinoy.

Biography 
On the death of his father in 1414, the ten year old Jean inherited the barony of Montmorency and several Lordships, including those of Écouen, Damville and Conflans. He was initially placed under the regency of her mother, Philippe, who died around 1419. In 1422, he married Jeanne de Fosseux (died ), daughter of Jean de Fosseux and Anne de Preures. Jeanne had also inherited a number of lands, principally in Flanders.

Jeanne de Fosseux's father was a favourite of Duke of Burgundy, John the Fearless. When Jeanne died in September 1431 she was buried at the Cordeliers de Senlis, and she left to her husband Jean her wealthy lands which were enclosed within the territory held by the house of Burgundy.

In 1443 Jean married for a second time, his new wife being Marguerite d'Orgemont, widow of the knight Guillaume Broullard and great-granddaughter of the French chancellor Pierre d'Orgemont, Lord of Chantilly.

Jean de Montmorency fought alongside King Louis XI against the self-proclaimed League of the Public Good, led by the Duke of Burgundy, Charles the Bold. His two sons, Jean III (later Jean de Nivelle) and Louis de Montmorency-Fosseux (from his first wife Jeanne de Fosseux), refused to join him and sided with Charles the Bold. Jean de Montmorency then decided to disinherit his two elder sons in favour of William, his third son, and the first son from his marriage to Marguerite d'Orgemont.

As a result of this, his son Jean sought refuge at Nivelle, a territory that belonged to his mother Jeanne de Fosseux. Here he became the founder of the Montmorency-Nevele branch of the family. It was following this episode that the Jean III became known as Jean de Nivelle, a name that was used as a form of mockery by the French. He was mocked in popular songs of the time, and later gave rise to the expression "the more you call him, the more he runs away like Jean de Nivelle's dog".

Despite lawsuits and property transactions involving the branches of the Niville, de Fosseux and Montmorency families, the familial lands situated in France remained the property of the descendants of Jean II's son William of Montmorency.

Ancestry 
Through the Montmorency's, Jean II de Montmorency was descended from the French king Louis VI (via Louis's son Robert I, Count of Dreux).

Marriages and descendants 

On , Jean II married Jeanne de Fosseux, Lady of Fosseux, d'Hauteville, Nivelle et Wismes (died 12 September 1431), daughter of Jean de Fosseux and Anne de Preure. They had the following children:

 Jean de Montmorency-Nivelle and Wismes (1422 – 26 June 1477), known as Jean de Nivelle. Among his descendants was his great-grandson Philippe II de Montmorency, Count of Horn
 Louis de Montmorency-Fosseux and d'Hauteville (died 1 October 1490). From him are descended the Dukes of Montmorency-Beaufort, and Montmorency-Bouteville, the Dukes of Piney-Luxembourg, the Dukes of Châtillon-Coligny, the Marquis de Royan and the Counts of Dukes of d'Olonne, the Lords of Tingry and the Lords of Robecque.

Around 1445, Jean married Marguerite d'Orgemont, heiress to the lordships of Chantilly, Montépilloy and Montjay, the daughter of Pierre d'Orgemont and Jacqueline Paynel. They had the following children:

 Marguerite de Montmorency (1445 – ) who married Nicolas d'Anglure on 
 William of Montmorency (1454 – ), Chamberlain of France, and the father of the Constable of France, Anne de Montmorency.
Her descendants stem from this marriage.

Notes and references 

Grand Chamberlains of France
1404 births
1477 deaths
15th-century French people
House of Montmorency